The phonological word or prosodic word (also called pword, PrWd; symbolised as ω) is a constituent in the phonological hierarchy higher than the syllable and the foot but lower than intonational phrase and the phonological phrase. It is largely held (Hall, 1999) to be a prosodic domain in which phonological features within the same lexeme may spread from one morph to another or from one clitic to a clitic host or from one clitic host to a clitic.

References
Hall, T. A. (1999). "The phonological word: a review" In: T. A. Hall & Ursula Kleinhenz (eds.) Studies on the Phonological Word. 1-22. Amsterdam: John Benjamins.

Phonology